Bernard Chesneau (born 5 May 1960) is a French former professional racing cyclist. He rode in the 1987 Tour de France.

References

External links
 

1960 births
Living people
French male cyclists
Sportspeople from Blois
Cyclists from Centre-Val de Loire